Giovanni Miranda was an Italian Hispanist and grammarian from the 16th century.

He wrote the important Osservationi della lingua castigliana... diuise in quatro libri: ne’ quali s’insegna con gran facilità la perfetta lingua spagnuola. Con due tauole: l’vna de’ capi essentiali, & l’altra delle cose notabile (Venice: Gabriel Giolito de Ferrari, 1566; modern edition of Juan M. Lope Blanch, Mexico: UNAM, 1998), partially inspired by the work of Giovanni Mario Alessandri.

References

Italian Hispanists
Grammarians from Italy
Linguists of Spanish
16th-century Italian writers